Aglossa gracilalis is a species of snout moth in the genus Aglossa. It was described by Rebel, in 1914, and is known from Egypt (it was described from Kassasine).

References

Moths described in 1914
Pyralini
Endemic fauna of Egypt
Moths of Africa